Hallenskog Station is a closed railway station located at Hallenskog in Asker, Norway on the Spikkestad Line. The station was opened as part of the Drammen Line in 1959, but in 1973 the new Lieråsen Tunnel opened through Lieråsen, and the old part of the Drammen Line was transformed to a commuter train line.

The station was served by the Oslo Commuter Rail to Oslo Central Station and onward to Lillestrøm. Hallenskog is primarily a residential area.

Railway stations in Røyken
Railway stations on the Spikkestad Line
Railway stations opened in 1933
1933 establishments in Norway